Robin Pare (16 July 1919 – 3 June 1942) was a South African flying ace of World War II, credited with five 'kills'.

He was born in Wynberg, near Cape Town, in 1919. He joined the Permanent Force in 1939 and went to Military College, receiving his commission in April 1940. He joined 1 Squadron SAAF in May 1940 in East Africa, where he stayed until April 1941.

He returned to South Africa as an instructor until October 1941 when he joined 5 Squadron SAAF in December 1941.

Death
He was shot down on 3 June 1942 by Hans-Joachim Marseille.

References

South African World War II flying aces
1919 births
1942 deaths
South African military personnel of World War II
South African military personnel killed in World War II
Aviators killed by being shot down